The Roman Catholic Diocese of Ho is a diocese located in the city of Ho in the Ecclesiastical province of Accra in Ghana.

History
 December 19, 1994: Established as Diocese of Ho from Diocese of Keta–Ho

Bishops
 Bishops of Ho (Roman rite)
 Bishop Francis Anani Kofi Lodonu (December 19, 1994 - July 14, 2015)
 Bishop Emmanuel Kofi Fianu (July 14, 2015 (installed October 3) -)

See also
Roman Catholicism in Ghana

Sources
 GCatholic.org
 Catholic Hierarchy

Roman Catholic dioceses in Ghana
Dioceses in Ghana
Christian organizations established in 1994
Roman Catholic dioceses and prelatures established in the 20th century
Roman Catholic Ecclesiastical Province of Accra